Maxime Chataignier (born  in Besançon) is a French short-track speed-skater.

Chataignier competed at the 2006 and 2010 Winter Olympics for France. In 2006, he was disqualified his opening heat of the 1000 metres and finished 4th in his opening heat of the 1500 metres, failing to advance in both.

In the 2010 Olympics,  he was disqualified in his opening heat of both the 1000 metres and 1500 metres, failing to advance. He was also part of the French 5000 metre relay team, which placed third in the semifinal, but was advanced to the final, where they finished 5th.

As of 2013, Chataignier's best performance at the World Championships came in 2011, when he finished 4th in the 1000 metres. He also won a silver medal as a member of the French relay team at the 2006 European Championships, and a gold with the relay team at the 2006 World Junior Championships.

As of 2013, Chataignier has five ISU Short Track Speed Skating World Cup podiums, with his best finish two silvers, one as part of the relay team in 2010–2011 at Montreal, and another in the 1000 metres at Changchun that season. He was also the overall champion in the 1500 metres in 2010–11.

World Cup Podiums

References

1988 births
Living people
French male short track speed skaters
Olympic short track speed skaters of France
Short track speed skaters at the 2006 Winter Olympics
Short track speed skaters at the 2010 Winter Olympics
Short track speed skaters at the 2014 Winter Olympics
Sportspeople from Besançon
Universiade bronze medalists for France
Universiade medalists in short track speed skating
Competitors at the 2011 Winter Universiade
21st-century French people